Buffalo Girls is a 1990 novel written by American author Larry McMurtry about Calamity Jane. It is written in the novel prose style mixed with a series of letters from Calamity Jane to her daughter. In her letters, Calamity describes herself as being a drunken hellraiser but never an outlaw. Her letters also describe her larger-than-life cohorts.

McMurtry depicts gritty events and relationships in the life of fur trappers, cowboys, soldiers, prostitutes, and Indians as the Wild West fades away, changing their way of life.  The characters struggle, and many fail, to adapt to the settling of the West.  In an effort to adapt and relive the Wild West, many of the characters, along with Calamity Jane, resort to performing in Buffalo Bill Cody's Wild West show. They exploit and are exploited by their frontier lifestyle, before being defeated by it in the end.

Film adaptation
Buffalo Girls was later the basis for the 1995 CBS made-for-TV movie starring Anjelica Huston as Calamity Jane and Melanie Griffith as Dora DuFran. Wild Bill Hickok was played by Sam Elliott, Annie Oakley by Reba McEntire, and Buffalo Bill Cody by Peter Coyote. The film also included Gabriel Byrne, Tracey Walter, Floyd Red Crow Westerman, Jack Palance, Russell Means (as Sitting Bull), and John Diehl (as George Armstrong Custer).

Some filming took place in Bristol Zoo and Bath.

References

1990 American novels
Novels by Larry McMurtry
American novels adapted into films
American novels adapted into television shows
Western (genre) novels
Wild West shows
Films about Wild West shows
Cultural depictions of Calamity Jane
Cultural depictions of Buffalo Bill
Cultural depictions of Sitting Bull
Cultural depictions of Annie Oakley
Cultural depictions of Wild Bill Hickok
Cultural depictions of George Armstrong Custer